James Moyer Franks (born August 27, 1972), better known by his stage name Jimmy Pop (originally Jimmy Pop Ali), is an American rapper, singer, musician, and songwriter. He is best known as the lead vocalist, rhythm guitarist, primary songwriter, and one of the founding members of the rap rock band Bloodhound Gang.

Early life and education
Pop was born in Trappe, Pennsylvania, the son of Alice Ann (born Moyer) and Richard Lee Franks. He is of German and Native American heritage, with Jewish ancestry. He was raised Lutheran, but ceased practicing as soon as his parents approved his request to do so.

He graduated from Perkiomen Valley High School in 1990 and commenced studies in mass communication and history at Temple University in Philadelphia, Pennsylvania, where he met future Bloodhound Gang bassist "Evil" Jared Hasselhoff.

Music career

Bang Chamber 8
Pop (then still going by his given name) played in a Depeche Mode cover band called Bang Chamber 8 with Mike Bowe (later known as Daddy Long Legs). Pop played guitar, while Bowe played bass and sang. In 1990, Bang Chamber 8 released a cassette of four original songs: "Wouldn't It Be Nice", "Birthday Boy", "Ice Cubes" and "War Chimes". These songs had nothing in common, lyrically or musically, with the Bloodhound Gang. "War Chimes" was written about Operation Desert Storm and featured a guitar solo from Pop at the end, who also provided the lead vocals. The synth line from "Birthday Boy" would be reused on a Bloodhound Gang track, "I'm the Least You Could Do", in 2005.

Bang Chamber 8 split in 1991. In 1992, Pop and Daddy started a hip hop group called the Bloodhound Gang which later became more of an alternative rock band. Daddy Long Legs left the Bloodhound Gang to start Wolfpac in 1997.

Bloodhound Gang

Side projects
Pop collaborated with Bam Margera, Brandon DiCamillo, and Jess Margera as The DiCamillo Sisters to record a Christmas single titled "But Why's It So Cold?" along with an accompanying video. Pop collaborated with dance artist Tomcraft for a song called "Broadsword Calling Danny Boy" in 2006. The song is featured on Tomcraft's official MySpace. In 2007, Pop collaborated with German group Scooter for a song titled "The Shit That Killed Elvis", which was featured on their album The Ultimate Aural Orgasm. Bam Margera can also be heard in the song's intro. The song reached number 2 in the German Hip Hop chart and remained there for two weeks. In 2010, Pop collaborated with German group Die Atzen for an English version of the song "Disco Pogo" which was featured on the Jersey Shore soundtrack. In 2022, he collaborated with Russian Hardbass group Russian Village Boys on their song “Daddy WTF?”, with its music video being released on February 22.

Acting career
Pop made an appearance in the CKY series of films, during a shopping cart race scene and slap fight in CKY 4. He also appeared in an episode of Viva La Bam titled "Limo vs Lambo", in which Pop borrowed Bam Margera's Lamborghini without telling him, causing Margera to accuse his close friends (specifically Ryan Dunn) of doing the deed. He also appeared on the Viva La Bam episode "Rockstars", in which Don Vito and Phil Margera attempt to become rock stars, leading Jimmy Pop to French kiss Don Vito onstage.

Pop has appeared on The Dudesons, being one of the people throwing darts during the human dart board stunt with Jarppi Leppälä. Pop appeared with fellow Bloodhound Gang member Evil Jared Hasselhoff in the film Minghags: The Movie, directed by Bam Margera. They are credited in the film as Jimmy Pop Ali and Evil Jared “Hollywood” Hasselhoff. Pop also appears in Bam Margera's movie called Where the ♯$&% Is Santa?. He appears in the music video for the Oleander’s cover of "Boys Don't Cry".

Filmography

Music videos

References

External links

1972 births
Living people
American male guitarists
American male singers
American male rappers
American people of German descent
American people of Jewish descent
American people who self-identify as being of Native American descent
American rock singers
American punk rock guitarists
Bloodhound Gang members
Guitarists from Philadelphia
People from Trappe, Pennsylvania
Rap rock musicians
Rappers from Philadelphia
21st-century American rappers
American baritones